Novoalexandrovsky is a rural locality (a khutor) in Zimnyatskoye Rural Settlement, Serafimovichsky District, Volgograd Oblast, Russia. The population was 137 as of 2010. There are 3 streets.

Geography 
Novoalexandrovsky is located in steppe, on the left bank of the Protok River, 6 km north of Serafimovich (the district's administrative centre) by road. Berezki is the nearest rural locality.

References 

Rural localities in Serafimovichsky District